Hazeltine Corporation was a defense electronics company which is now part of BAE Systems Inc.

History

1924–1986

The company was founded in 1924 by investors to exploit the Neutrodyne patent of Dr. Louis Alan Hazeltine. Headquartered in Greenlawn, Long Island, New York, since 1955, it had facilities in several other locations in Long Island, including its Wheeler Laboratories facility in Smithtown, New York, manufacturing plants in Riverhead and Little Neck, NY, and a division in Braintree, Massachusetts.

The company originally concentrated on the design of electronic circuits and the licensing of patents. Innovations in radio, monochrome and later color television components allowed the company to grow. One particularly lucrative design was the Automatic Gain Control circuit. This was such a useful feature that almost every AM radio made used this feature, by license from Hazeltine, from about 1930 until the patent expired. Hazeltine Corporation also developed and licensed many of the basic concepts of the NTSC color television system.

From 1955 to 1959 the president of the Hazeltine Company was Philip La Follette, former three-term governor of Wisconsin and son of "Fighting Bob" La Follette, who campaigned for president in 1924 as the Progressive Party candidate.

The company flourished into the 1980s as a United States Federal defense contractor with particular success as a designer and manufacturer of "Identification Friend or Foe" (IFF) military detection and identification systems.

During the 1970s, as an outgrowth of its defense work, Hazeltine Corp. developed the Hazeltine Terminal, an early monochrome smart terminal. Several improved models followed, including the popular Hazeltine 1500, which found use in the emerging microcomputer market in the late 1970s. The company eventually sold the terminal line to a short-lived third party called Esprit, which was managed by former Hazeltine employees.

Hazeltine Corporation's terminal division was spun off into Esprit Systems in January 1983. The name of the spin-off refers to the Hazeltine Esprit terminal, which division management felt Hazeltine was not properly marketing.

1986–present
Hazeltine was acquired by the Emerson Electric Company in 1986.

In 1990, Emerson spun off its Government and Defense Group, including Hazeltine, to form ESCO Electronics Corporation.

In 1996, Hazeltine was acquired from ESCO by GEC-Marconi Electronic Systems Corp., a US subsidiary of The General Electric Company, and renamed GEC-Marconi Hazeltine. ESCO was represented by investment banking firm Quarterdeck Investment Partners, Inc. in a deal which valued Hazeltine at $110 million.

With the 1999 merger of GEC-Marconi and British Aerospace to form BAE Systems, GEC-Marconi Hazeltine was renamed BAE Systems Advanced Systems. In 2002, it was renamed BAE Systems CNIR (Communication, Navigation, Identification and Reconnaissance).

In a 2007 reorganization, the division was folded into BAE Systems Electronics and Integrated Solutions and is currently known as BAE Systems Sensor Systems.

References

External links 

Richard S. Shuford information on Hazeltine terminals
Description of Hazeltine 2000 video terminal, ca. 1972, at Columbia University
Hazeltine 2000 photo
Molnar, Mike, Hazeltine, the Neutrodyne and the Hazeltine Corporation, The AWA Review (Vol. 26, 2013).

Defunct computer hardware companies
Avionics companies
Defunct companies based in New York (state)
History of radio

1924 establishments in New York (state)
1986 disestablishments in New York (state)
1986 mergers and acquisitions
1996 mergers and acquisitions
2007 mergers and acquisitions
Computer companies established in 1924
Defunct computer companies of the United States
Electronics companies established in 1924
Electronics companies of the United States
Manufacturing companies established in 1924
Manufacturing companies of the United States
Defense companies of the United States